Nachane is a census town in Ratnagiri district in the Indian state of Maharashtra.

Demographics
 India census, Nachane had a population of 9236. Males constitute 52% of the population and females 48%. Nachane has an average literacy rate of 79%, higher than the national average of 59.5%: male literacy is 82%, and female literacy is 76%. In Nachane, 12% of the population is under 6 years of age.

References

Cities and towns in Ratnagiri district